The 1996–97 Boston College Eagles men's basketball team represented Boston College as members of the Big East Conference during the 1996–97 NCAA Division I men's basketball season. The team was led by 11th-year head coach Jim O'Brien and played their home games at the Silvio O. Conte Forum in Boston, Massachusetts.

After finishing tied atop the Big East regular season standings, the Eagles won the Big East tournament to receive an automatic bid to the NCAA tournament as No. 5 seed in the West region. After defeating a game Valparaiso team in the opening round, the Eagles were eliminated in overtime by Saint Joseph's, 81–77, in the round of 32.

Roster

Schedule and results

|-
!colspan=12 style=| Regular season

|-
!colspan=12 style=| Big East tournament

|-
!colspan=12 style=| NCAA Tournament

Sources

Rankings

References

Boston College Eagles men's basketball seasons
Boston College Eagles
Boston College
Boston Coll
Boston Coll